The 2018 Clare Senior Hurling Championship was the 123rd staging of the Clare Senior Hurling Championship since its establishment by the Clare County Board in 1887. The draw for the opening round fixtures took place in April 2018. The championship began on 18 August 2018 and ended on 21 October 2018.

Sixmilebridge were the defending champions, however, they were defeated by Cratloe at the quarter-final stage. St. Joseph's, Doora-Barefield were relegated from the championship.

On 21 October 2018, Ballyea won the championship following a 1–20 to 1–14 defeat of Cratloe in the final. This was their second championship title overall and their first title in two championship seasons.

Ballyea's Niall Deasy was the championship's top scorer with 2-48.

Senior Championship Knockout Stages

Quarter-finals

Semi-finals

County Final

Championship statistics

Top scorers

Overall

References

External links

Clare Senior Hurling Championship
Clare Senior Hurling Championship